The men's 100 metre butterfly competition of the swimming events at the 1973 World Aquatics Championships took place on September 8.

Records
Prior to the competition, the existing world and championship records were as follows.

The following records were established during the competition:

Results

Heats
25 swimmers participated in 4 heats. The eight fastest times advanced to the final.

Roland Mattes had to withdraw from the event following a poolside accident when he slipped and sprained his ankle.

Final
The results of the final are below.

References

Butterfly 100 metre, men's
World Aquatics Championships